Eugnosta bimaculana, the narrow-patch carolella moth or two-spotted carolella, is a species of moth of the family Tortricidae. It is found from Maryland to Florida, west to Texas and Oklahoma.

The wingspan is 13–14 mm. The forewings are light brown with two large dark brown patches in median and subterminal areas. Adults have been recorded year round in the southern part of the range. In the north, the flight times are usually between May/June and September/October.

References

Moths described in 1869
Eugnosta